"Sweet Dreams (Are Made of This)" is a song by British new wave music duo Eurythmics. It is the title track of their album of the same name (1983) and was released as the fourth and final single from the album in early 1983. The song became their breakthrough hit, establishing the duo worldwide. Its music video helped to propel the song to number two on the UK Singles Chart and number one on the US Billboard Hot 100; it was their first single released in the US. 

Appearing with orange cropped hair and wearing a man's business suit, the BBC stated Annie Lennox's "powerful androgynous look" was the music video that "broke the mould for female pop stars“. Rolling Stone called the song "a synth-pop masterpiece that made Lennox and Dave Stewart MTV superstars".

After the song's rise, the duo's previous single, "Love Is a Stranger", was re-released and also became a worldwide hit. On Rolling Stone's The 500 Greatest Songs of All Time issue in 2003, "Sweet Dreams (Are Made of This)" was ranked number 356. In 2020, the song was inducted into the Grammy Hall of Fame. Eurythmics have regularly performed the song in all their live sets since 1982, and it is often performed by Lennox on her solo tours.

Recorded by Eurythmics in a small project studio in North London, the song's success heralded a trend of musicians abandoning larger recording studios for home recording methods. In 1991, the song was remixed and reissued to promote Eurythmics' Greatest Hits album. It re-charted in the UK, reaching number 48, and was also a moderate hit in dance clubs. Another remix by Steve Angello was released in France in 2006, along with the track "I've Got a Life".

Background

Composition
Annie Lennox and Dave Stewart wrote the song after the Tourists had broken up and they formed Eurythmics.  Although the two of them also broke up as a couple, they continued to work together. They became interested in electronic music and bought new synthesizers to play around with. According to Stewart, he managed to produce the beat and riff of the song on one of their new synthesizers, and Lennox, on hearing it, said: "What the hell is that?" and started playing on another synthesizer, and beginnings of the song came out of the two dueling synths.

According to Lennox, the lyrics reflected the unhappy time after the break up of the Tourists, when she felt that they were "in a dream world" and that whatever they were chasing was never going to happen. She described the song as saying: "Look at the state of us. How can it get worse?" adding "I was feeling very vulnerable. The song was an expression of how I felt: hopeless and nihilistic." Stewart, however, thought the lyrics too depressing and added the "hold your head up, moving on" line to make it more uplifting.

Commenting on the line "Some of them want to use you … some of them want to be abused", Lennox said that "people think it’s about sex or S&M, and it’s not about that at all".

Recording
"Sweet Dreams" was created and recorded in two places, first in Eurythmics' tiny project studio in the Chalk Farm district of London above a picture framing shop, then in a small room at The Church Studios in North London. The home studio was equipped with a Tascam 80-8, 8-track half-inch tape recorder, a Soundcraft mixer, a Roland Space Echo, a Klark Teknik DN50 spring reverb, a B.E.L. Electronics noise reduction unit, and a single Beyerdynamic M 201 TG microphone.

Also purchased with the bank loan was a £2000 Movement Systems Drum Computer, one of only about 30 built, with the band having to sleep for a few days at the Bridgwater apartment of the manufacturer while their early prototype unit was being assembled. The MCS Drum Computer provided drum sounds, and also triggered sequences on a Roland SH-101 synthesizer, used for the synth bass line. To fill out the complement of instruments, Lennox played a borrowed Oberheim OB-X for sustained string sounds. Their only microphone, a utilitarian model typically used for hi-hat, performed all the acoustic duties, including tracking Lennox's vocals.

Stewart recalls he was in a manic mood while Lennox was depressed. Stewart was upbeat because he had just survived surgery on a punctured lung, and felt like he had been given a new lease on life. Lennox was feeling low because of the poor results from past musical work. She perked up when she heard Stewart first experimenting with the song's bass line sequence. She "leaped off the floor" and started to fill in the song with the Oberheim synth.

According to Stewart, the record company did not think the song was suitable as a single in the United States as it lacked a chorus. However, when a radio DJ in Cleveland kept playing the song from the album, and it generated a strong local response, the label decided to release it in the US.

Chart performance
"Sweet Dreams" was Eurythmics' commercial breakthrough in the United Kingdom and all over the world. The single entered the UK Singles Chart at number 63 in February 1983 and reached number two the following month, spending a total of six weeks in the Top 5. It was the 11th best-selling single of 1983 in the UK and has been certified double platinum by the British Phonographic Industry.
 
"Sweet Dreams" was the first-ever single released by Eurythmics in the United States when it was released in May 1983. The single debuted at number 90 and slowly eased up the chart. By August, the single had reached number two and stayed there for four weeks before it took the number one spot.

Music video
 
The music video for "Sweet Dreams" was directed by Chris Ashbrook and filmed in January 1983, shortly before the single and the album were released. The video received heavy airplay on the then-fledgling MTV channel and is widely considered a classic clip from the early-MTV era. Rolling Stone stated it "made Annie Lennox and Dave Stewart MTV superstars".

The video begins with a fist pounding on a table, with the camera panning up to reveal Lennox in a boardroom, with images of a Saturn V launch projected on a screen behind her, which are later replaced by a shot of a crowd walking down a street. Stewart is shown typing on a computer (actually an MCS drum computer). The camera cuts to Lennox and Stewart meditating on the table. Stewart is next shown playing cello in a field. The scene then returns to the boardroom, with Lennox and Stewart lying down on the table, and a cow walking around them. Stewart is shown again typing on the computer, with the cow feeding next to him. The scene cuts to the duo in a field, with a herd of cows, and Stewart still typing. Lennox and Stewart are then seen floating in a boat, with Stewart again playing the cello. The video ends with Lennox lying in bed, with the last shot being a book on a nightstand bearing a cover identical to the album. The screen then fades to black as Lennox turns off the bedside lamp.

Lennox's androgynous visual image, with close-cropped, orange-coloured hair, and attired in a man's suit brandishing a cane, immediately made her a household name. The BBC stated her "powerful androgynous look" was the music video that "broke the mould for female pop stars“. Her gender-bending image was also explored in other Eurythmics videos such as "Love Is a Stranger" and "Who's That Girl?" and with her appearance as Elvis Presley at the 1984 Grammy Awards.

Track listings
 7" single
A: "Sweet Dreams (Are Made of This)" (LP Version) – 3:36
B: "I Could Give You a Mirror" (Alternate Version) – 4:15

 12" single
A: "Sweet Dreams (Are Made of This)" (Extended Version) – 4:48
B1: "I Could Give You a Mirror" (Alternate Version) – 4:15
B2: "Baby's Gone Blue" (non-LP track) – 4:19

 3" CD (1989 re-release)
"Sweet Dreams (Are Made of This)" (LP version) – 3:36
"I Could Give You a Mirror" (Alternate Version) – 4:15
"Here Comes the Rain Again" (LP Version) – 4:54
"Paint a Rumour" – 7:30

 CD single (1991 re-release)
"Sweet Dreams (Are Made of This) '91" (remixed by Giorgio Moroder) - (3:35)
"Sweet Dreams (Are Made of This)" (Nightmare Remix) - (7:27)
"Sweet Dreams (Are Made of This)" (Hot Remix) (remixed by Giorgio Moroder) - (5:21)
"Sweet Dreams (Are Made Of This)" (House Remix) (remixed by Giorgio Moroder) - (3:34)

 Digital download
"Sweet Dreams (Are Made of This)" (Ummet Ozcan Remix) - (3:22)
"Sweet Dreams (Are Made of This)" (Noisia Remix) - (6:02)

Credits and personnel
Annie Lennox – vocals, synthesizer, piano
David A. Stewart – synthesizer, programming

Charts

Weekly charts

Year-end charts

1991 reissue

1995 reissue

2006 reissue

2010 reissue

2020 reissue

Steve Angello Remix

All-time charts

Certifications

Cover versions

Swing featuring Dr. Alban version

In 1995, American rapper and singer Swing (aka Richard Silva II) released a dance cover of "Sweet Dreams" featuring the Sweden-based musician and producer Dr. Alban. The female singer in the song is Swedish singer Birgitta Edoff. Alban produced the single after Swing was signed to his label, Dr. Records. This version was a major hit in Europe, peaking at number four in Finland, number nine in Denmark, number 12 in Sweden, and number 44 in the Netherlands. In the UK, the track reached number 59.

Critical reception
Pan-European magazine Music & Media commented, "Nomen est omen; indeed it's a cover of Eurythmics' first hit. Also, what Swing promises is what you get. It's heavily Eurofied with the Swedish rap specialist cutting his teeth on it." Alan Jones from British magazine Music Week wrote, "From Sweden, Swing featuring Dr. Alban offer a bludgeoning techno version dominated by rap, with occasional reprises of the title line by Birgitta Edoff". James Hamilton from the magazine's RM Dance Update described it as a "cheesier cornily rapped Swedish remake".

Track listings

Charts

Marilyn Manson cover

Marilyn Manson released a cover version as the first single from Smells Like Children (1995), an EP of covers, remixes and interludes. In his 1998 autobiography, the band's eponymous vocalist said he fought their label to have this track released as a single, saying: "They didn't want to release [it], which I knew would be a song that even people who didn't like our band would like. [Nothing] wanted to release our version of Screamin' Jay Hawkins' 'I Put a Spell on You', which was far too dark, sprawling and esoteric, even for some of our own fans. We battled the label this time, and learned we could win. ... It was a disheartening experience, but it didn't hurt half as much as the fact that no one at our label ever congratulated us on the success of the song."

The track became the band's first legitimate hit. The music video was directed by American photographer Dean Karr, and was shot near downtown Los Angeles. It featured images of the vocalist self-mutilating while wearing a tutu, as well as scenes of him riding a pig. It was placed on heavy rotation on MTV, and was nominated for Best Rock Video at the 1996 MTV Video Music Awards. In 2010, Billboard rated it the "scariest music video ever made", beating Michael Jackson's "Thriller". The video also appeared at number three in the publication's 2013 list of "The 15 Scariest Music Videos Ever". Dave Stewart has said that he liked this version of his song, and that "the video was one of the scariest things [he]'d seen at the time." As of 2020, the track has sold 80,000 copies through digital retailers in the United Kingdom, where it is also the band's most streamed music video, generating almost 12 million audio and video streams.

The song went on to appear on the band's 2004 greatest hits album, Lest We Forget: The Best Of. It also featured on soundtracks to the films Enron: The Smartest Guys in the Room (2005), Gamer (2009), and A Perfect Day (2015), in movies such as House on Haunted Hill (1999), and Trick 'r Treat (2007), as well as the trailer for Wrath of the Titans (2012), in the pilot episode of The Following, on the BBC drama Luther, and the Nature three-part miniseries "Okavango: River of Dreams".  Britney Spears created a music video using Manson's version of the song. This video – also directed by Chris Ashbrook – was used as an interlude on her 2009 concert tour The Circus Starring Britney Spears.

Track listing
 CD single
 "Sweet Dreams (Are Made of This)" – 4:25
 "Dance of the Dope Hats"  – 4:46
 "Down in the Park"  – 4:58
 "Lunchbox (Next Motherfucker)"  – 4:47

Charts

Certifications

JX Riders featuring Skylar Stecker version
In 2016, JX Riders featuring Skylar Stecker went to number one on the US dance chart with their version.

Weekly charts

Year-end charts

See also
List of Billboard Hot 100 number-one singles of 1983

References

External links

1982 songs
1983 singles
1995 singles
Billboard Hot 100 number-one singles
Cashbox number-one singles
Eurythmics songs
Dr. Alban songs
Marilyn Manson (band) songs
Miss Kittin songs
RCA Records singles
Interscope Records singles
Nothing Records singles
RPM Top Singles number-one singles
SNEP Top Singles number-one singles
Song recordings produced by Dave Stewart (musician and producer)
Song recordings produced by Trent Reznor
Songs written by Annie Lennox
Songs written by David A. Stewart
Songs written by Marilyn Manson
Songs about dreams